The Girls from Thunder Strip is an exploitation film in the biker genre. It is directed by David L. Hewitt.  Hewitt also co produced it with Michael Mehas. It was released in 1966. It also featured American Top 40 DJ Casey Kasem.

Story
The film is about a trio of hillbilly girls who take on a biker gang over moonshine. The story line is basically about female bootleggers taking on a biker gang which is led by a typical bad biker called Teach. They have to also deal with federal agent (played by Casey Kasem) who has been sent to the area to close the whiskey operation.

Cast
 Jody McCrea .... Pike
 Maray Ayres .... Red
 Mick Mehas
 Casey Kasem .... Conrad
 Lindsay Crosby
 William Bonner .... Animal
 Megan Timothy .... Jessie
 Gary Kent .... Teach
 Melinda MacHarg .... Lil
 Jack Starrett ... Sheriff
 Eve Curtis
 Dan Kemp .... Luther
 Bruce Kimball .... Orville
 Lisa Tinelli 
 Alex Elliot .... Alex
 Robert H. O'Neil
 Ricky Roberts
 Tiffany Stone
 Harry Woolman
 Joe McManus 
 Gary Graver .... Pike's cousin
 Randee Lynne Jensen .... Raped girl

Releases

References

External links
 Imdb: The Girls from Thunder Strip

Outlaw biker films
1970s English-language films
Films directed by David L. Hewitt